This is a list of military aircraft that are primarily designed for air-to-air combat and thus does not include aircraft intended for other roles where they have some secondary air-to-air capability, such as with many ground attack aircraft. The list does not include projects that were cancelled before an aircraft was built or fictional aircraft.

List

|-
|ACAZ C.2||Belgium||Two-seat fighter||1926||Prototype||||
|-
|Adamoli-Cattani fighter||Italy||||1918||Prototype||||
|-
|AD Scout||UK||Zeppelin interceptor||1915||Prototype||||
|-
|AEG D.I, D.II & D.III||Germany||||1917||Prototype||||
|-
|AEG Dr.I||Germany||||1917||Prototype||||
|-
|Aerfer Ariete||Italy||||1958||Prototype||||
|-
|Aerfer Sagittario 2||Italy||Lightweight fighter||1956||Prototype||||
|-
|Aero Ae 02||Czechoslovakia||||1920||Prototype||||
|-
|Aero Ae 04||Czechoslovakia||||1921||Prototype||||
|-
|Aero A.18||Czechoslovakia||||1923||Production||||
|-
|Aero A.19||Czechoslovakia||||1923||Prototype||||
|-
|Aero A.20||Czechoslovakia||||1923||Prototype||||
|-
|Aero A.102||Czechoslovakia||||1934||Prototype||||
|-
|Aeromarine PG-1||US||Fighter-bomber||1922||Prototype||||
|-
|Aeronautica Umbra Trojani AUT.18||Italy||||1939||Prototype||||
|-
|AIDC F-CK-1 Ching-kuo||Taiwan||fighter-bomber||1989||Operational||||
|-
|Airco DH.1||UK||Two-seat fighter||1915||Production|| ca.||
|-
|Airco DH.2||UK||||1915||Production||||
|-
|Airco DH.5||UK||||1916||Production||||
|-
|Albatros D.I||Germany||||1916||Production||||
|-
|Albatros D.II||Germany||||1916||Production||||
|-
|Albatros D.III||Germany||||1916||Production||||
|-
|Albatros D.IV||Germany||||1916||Prototype||||
|-
|Albatros D.V & D.Va||Germany||||1917||Production||||
|-
|Albatros D.VI||Germany||||1918||Prototype||||
|-
|Albatros D.VII||Germany||||1917||Prototype||||
|-
|Albatros D.IX||Germany||||1918||Prototype||||
|-
|Albatros D.X||Germany||||1918||Prototype||||
|-
|Albatros D.XI||Germany||||1918||Prototype||||
|-
|Albatros D.XII||Germany||||1918||Prototype||||
|-
|Albatros Dr.I||Germany||||1917||Prototype||||
|-
|Albatros Dr.II||Germany||||1918||Prototype||||
|-
|Albatros L 65||Germany||Fighter-reconnaissance ||1925||Prototype||||
|-
|Albatros L 77v||Germany||Fighter-reconnaissance||1928||Prototype||||
|-
|Albatros L 84||Germany||Two-seat fighter||1931||Prototype||||
|-
|Albatros W.4||Germany||Floatplane fighter||1916||Production||||
|-
|Albree Pigeon-Fraser Pursuit||US||||1917||Prototype||||
|-
|Alcock Scout||UK||||1917||Prototype||||
|-
|Alekseyev I-211 & 215||USSR||||1947||Prototype||||
|-
|Alter A.1||Germany||||1917||Prototype||||
|-
|Ambrosini SAI.107 & 207||Italy||Lightweight fighter||1940||Production||||
|-
|Ambrosini SAI.403||Italy||Lightweight fighter||1943||Prototype||||
|-
|Ambrosini SS.4||Italy||||1939||Prototype||||
|-
|Amiot 110||France||Lightweight Jockey fighter||1928||Prototype||||
|-
|Anatra Anadis||Russia||||1916||Prototype||||
|-
|ANF Les Mureaux 114||France||Night fighter||1931||Prototype||||
|-
|ANF Les Mureaux 130/Les Mureaux 3 & 4||France||Fighter-reconnaissance||1927||Prototype||||
|-
|ANF Les Mureaux 170||France||||1932||Prototype||||
|-
|ANF Les Mureaux 180||France||Two-seat fighter||1935||Prototype||||
|-
|ANF Les Mureaux 190||France||Lightweight fighter||1936||Prototype||||
|-
|Ansaldo A.1 Balilla||Italy||||1917||Production||||
|-
|Ansaldo ISVA||Italy||Floatplane fighter||1917||Production||||
|-
|Ansaldo SVA||Italy||Fighter-reconnaissance||1917||Production||||
|-
|Arado SD I||Germany||||1927||Prototype||||
|-
|Arado SD II||Germany||||1929||Prototype||||
|-
|Arado SD III||Germany||||1929||Prototype||||
|-
|Arado SSD I||Germany||Floatplane fighter||1930||Prototype||||
|-
|Arado Ar 64||Germany||||1930||Production||||
|-
|Arado Ar 65||Germany||||1931||Production||||
|-
|Arado Ar 67||Germany||||1933||Prototype||||
|-
|Arado Ar 68||Germany||||1934||Production||||
|-
|Arado Ar 76||Germany||Lightweight fighter||1934||Production||||
|-
|Arado Ar 80||Germany||||1935||Prototype||||
|-
|Arado Ar 197||Germany||Carrier fighter||1937||Prototype||||
|-
|Arado Ar 240||Germany||Heavy fighter||1940||Prototype||||
|-
|Arado Ar 440||Germany||Heavy fighter||1942||Prototype||||
|-
|Armstrong Whitworth Ara||UK||||1919||Prototype||||
|-
|Armstrong Whitworth Armadillo||UK||||1918||Prototype||||
|-
|Armstrong Whitworth A.W.16||UK||||1930||Production||||
|-
|Armstrong Whitworth F.K.6||UK||Escort fighter||1916||Prototype||||
|-
|Armstrong Whitworth F.K.9 & 10||UK||||1916||Prototype||||
|-
|Armstrong Whitworth Siskin||UK||||1919||Production||||
|-
|Armstrong Whitworth Starling||UK||||1927||Prototype||||
|-
|Armstrong Whitworth AW.35 Scimitar||UK||||1935||Production||||
|-
|Army Arsenal Model 3||Japan||||1927||Prototype||||
|-
|Arsenal-Delanne 10||France||||1941||Prototype||||
|-
|Arsenal VG-30 - 39||France||Lightweight fighter||1938||Production||+||
|-
|Arsenal VB 10||France||Interceptor||1945||Prototype||||
|-
|Arsenal VG 90||France||Carrier fighter||1949||Prototype||||
|-
|Atlas Cheetah||South Africa||Fighter-bomber||1986||Operational||||
|-
|Austin-Ball A.F.B.1||UK||||1917||Prototype||||
|-
|Austin Osprey||UK||||1918||Prototype||||
|-
|Austin Greyhound||UK||Two-seat fighter||1919||Prototype||||
|-
|Avia BH-3||Czechoslovakia||||1921||Production||||
|-
|Avia BH-4||Czechoslovakia||||1922||Prototype||||
|-
|Avia BH-6||Czechoslovakia||||1923||Prototype||||
|-
|Avia BH-7||Czechoslovakia||||1923||Prototype||||
|-
|Avia BH-8||Czechoslovakia||||1923||Prototype||||
|-
|Avia BH-17||Czechoslovakia||||1924||Production||||
|-
|Avia BH-19||Czechoslovakia||||1924||Prototype||||
|-
|Avia BH-21||Czechoslovakia||||1925||Production||||
|-
|Avia BH-23||Czechoslovakia||Night fighter||1926||Prototype||||
|-
|Avia BH-33||Czechoslovakia||||1927||Production||||
|-
|Avia B-34||Czechoslovakia||||1932||Production||||
|-
|Avia B-534||Czechoslovakia||||1933||Production||||
|-
|Avia B-634||Czechoslovakia||||1936||Prototype||||
|-
|Avia B-35||Czechoslovakia||||1938||Prototype||||
|-
|Avia B-135||Czechoslovakia||||1939||Production||||
|-
|Avia S-199||Czechoslovakia||||1947||Production||||
|-
|Aviatik (Berg) D.I||Austria-Hungary||||1917||Production|| ca.||
|-
|Aviatik (Berg) D.II||Austria-Hungary||||1917||Production||||
|-
|Aviatik D.III||Germany||||1917||Prototype||||
|-
|Aviatik D.VI||Germany||||1918||Prototype||||
|-
|Aviatik D.VII||Germany||||1918||Prototype||||
|-
|Aviméta 88||France||Night fighter||1927||Prototype||||
|-
|Aviotehas PN-3||Estonia||Fighter-reconnaissance||1939||Prototype||||
|-
|AVIS I||Hungary||||1933||Prototype||||
|-
|AVIS II||Hungary||||1935||Prototype||||
|-
|AVIS III||Hungary||||1935||Prototype||||
|-
|AVIS IV||Hungary||||1937||Prototype||||
|-
|Avro 504||UK||Zeppelin interceptor||1913||Production||||
|-
|Avro 523 Pike||UK||Zeppelin interceptor||1916||Prototype||||
|-
|Avro 527||UK||Fighter-reconnaissance||1916||Prototype||||
|-
|Avro 530||UK||Two-seat fighter||1917||Prototype||||
|-
|Avro 531 Spider||UK||||1918||Prototype||||
|-
|Avro 566 Avenger||UK||||1926||Prototype||||
|-
|Avro 584 Avocet||UK||Fleet fighter||1927||Prototype||||
|-
|Avro Canada CF-100 Canuck||Canada||All-weather interceptor||1950||Production||||
|-
|Avro Canada CF-105 Arrow||Canada||All-weather interceptor||1958||Prototype||||
|-
|Bachem Ba 349||Germany||VTO rocket interceptor||1945||Prototype||||
|-
|BAJ IV||France||Two-seat fighter||1919||Prototype||||
|-
|BAT Bantam||UK||||1918||Prototype||||
|-
|BAT Basilisk||UK||||1918||Prototype||||
|-
|Baykar Bayraktar Kızılelma||Turkey||Unmanned fighter||2023||Prototype||||
|-
|Beardmore W.B.2||UK||||1917||Prototype||||
|-
|Beardmore W.B.III||UK||Shipboard fighter||1917||Production||||
|-
|Beardmore W.B.IV||UK||Shipboard fighter|||1917||Prototype||||
|-
|Beardmore W.B.V||UK||Shipboard fighter||1917||Prototype||||
|-
|Beardmore W.B.XXVI||UK||Two-seat fighter||1925||Prototype||||
|-
|Bell YFM-1 Airacuda||US||Interceptor||1937||Production||||
|-
|Bell XFL Airabonita||US||Carrier fighter||1940||Prototype||||
|-
|Bell P-39 Airacobra||US||||1938||Production||||
|-
|Bell P-59 Airacomet||US||||1942||Production||||
|-
|Bell P-63 Kingcobra||US||||1942||Production||||
|-
|Bell XP-77||US||Lightweight fighter||1944||Prototype||||
|-
|Bell XP-83||US||Escort fighter||1945||Prototype||||
|-
|Berkmans Speed Scout||US||||1917||Prototype||||
|-
|Bereznyak-Isayev BI-1||USSR||Interceptor rocket||1942||Prototype||||
|-
|Berliner-Joyce XFJ||US||Carrier fighter||1930||Prototype||||
|-
|Berliner-Joyce F2J||US||Carrier fighter||1933||Production||||
|-
|Berliner-Joyce XF3J||US||Carrier fighter||1934||Prototype||||
|-
|Berliner-Joyce P-16||US||||1930||Production||||
|-
|Bernard SIMB AB 10||France||||1924||Prototype||||
|-
|Bernard SIMB AB 12||France||||1926||Prototype||||
|-
|Bernard SIMB AB 14||France||||1925||Prototype||||
|-
|Bernard 15||France||||1926||Prototype||||
|-
|Bernard 20||France||||1929||Prototype||||
|-
|Bernard H.52||France||Floatplane fighter||1933||Prototype||||
|-
|Bernard 74 & 75||France||||1931||Prototype||||
|-
|Bernard H 110||France||Floatplane fighter||1935||Prototype||||
|-
|Bernard 260||France||||1932||Prototype||||
|-
|Bisnovat SK-2||USSR||||1940||Prototype||||
|-
|Blackburn F.3||UK||||1934||Prototype||||
|-
|Blackburn Firebrand||UK||Torpedo fighter||1942||Production||||
|-
|Blackburn Firecrest||UK||Strike fighter||1947||Prototype||||
|-
|Blackburn Lincock||UK||Lightweight fighter||1928||Production||||
|-
|Blackburn Roc||UK||Turret fighter||1938||Production||||
|-
|Blackburn Skua||UK||Fighter/dive bomber||1937||Production||||
|-
|Blackburn Triplane||UK||Zeppelin interceptor||1917||Prototype||||
|-
|Blackburn Turcock||UK||Interceptor/fleet fighter||1927||Prototype||||
|-
|Blériot 118||France||Flying-boat fighter||1925||Prototype||||
|-
|Blériot-SPAD S.41||France||||1922||Prototype||||
|-
|Blériot-SPAD S.51||France||||1924||Production||+||
|-
|Blériot-SPAD S.60||France||Two-seat fighter||1926||Prototype||||
|-
|Blériot-SPAD S.61||France||||1923||Production||+||
|-
|Blériot-SPAD S.70||France||||1927||Prototype||||
|-
|Blériot-SPAD S.71||France||||1923||Prototype||||
|-
|Blériot-SPAD S.72||France||||1923||Prototype||||
|-
|Blériot-SPAD S.81||France||||1923||Production||+||
|-
|Blériot-SPAD S.91||France||Lightweight Jockey fighter||1927||Prototype||||
|-
|Blériot-SPAD S.510||France||||1933||Production||||
|-
|Blériot-SPAD S.710||France||||1937||Prototype||||
|-
|Bloch MB.150-157||France||||1937||Production||||
|-
|Blohm & Voss BV 40||Germany||Interceptor glider||1944||Prototype||||
|-
|Blohm & Voss BV 155||Germany||High-altitude interceptor||1944||Prototype||||
|-
|Boeing FB||US||Carrier fighter||1923||Production||||
|-
|Boeing F2B||US||Carrier fighter||1926||Production||||
|-
|Boeing F3B||US||Carrier fighter||1928||Production||||
|-
|Boeing F4B||US||Carrier fighter||1928||Production||||
|-
|Boeing XF5B||US||Carrier fighter||1930||Prototype||||
|-
|Boeing XF6B||US||Fighter-bomber||1933||Prototype||||
|-
|Boeing XF7B||US||Carrier fighter||1933||Prototype||||
|-
|Boeing XF8B||US||Carrier fighter||1944||Prototype||||
|-
|Boeing PW-9||US||||1923||Production||||
|-
|Boeing XP-4||US||||1927||Prototype||||
|-
|Boeing XP-7||US||||1928||Prototype||||
|-
|Boeing XP-8||US||||1928||Prototype||||
|-
|Boeing XP-9||US||||1930||Prototype||||
|-
|Boeing P-12||US||||1929||Production||||
|-
|Boeing XP-15||US||||1930||Prototype||||
|-
|Boeing P-26 Peashooter||US||||1932||Production||||
|-
|Boeing P-29||US||||1934||Prototype||||
|-
|Boeing Model 100||US||||1929||Production||||
|-
|Boeing Model 218||US||||1929||Production||||
|-
|Boeing Model 256||US||||1932||Production||||
|-
|Boeing Model 267||US||||1933||Production||||
|-
|Boeing F/A-18E/F Super Hornet||US||Carrier fighter-bomber||1995||Operational||||
|-
|Boeing X-32||US||||2000||Prototype||||
|-
|Bolkhovitinov I-1||USSR||Fighter-bomber||1940||Prototype||||
|-
|Borel-Boccacio Type 3000||France||Two-seat fighter||1919||Prototype||||
|-
|Borel C.A.P. 2||France||High-altitude fighter||1920||Prototype||||
|-
|Borovkov-Florov I-207||USSR||||1937||Prototype||||
|-
|Boulton & Paul Bobolink||UK||||1918||Prototype||||
|-
|Boulton Paul Defiant||UK||Turret fighter||1937||Production||||
|-
|Boulton & Paul Partridge||UK||||1928||Prototype||||
|-
|Breda Ba.27||Italy||||1933||Production||||
|-
|Breguet BUC/BLC||France||Escort fighter ||1915||Prototype|| ca.||
|-
|Breguet LE Laboratoire Eiffel||France||||1918||Prototype||||
|-
|Breguet Taon||France||Strike fighter||1957||Prototype||||
|-
|Breguet 17||France||Night fighter||1918||Production||||
|-
|Brewster F2A Buffalo||US||Carrier fighter||1937||Production||||
|-
|Bristol Badger||UK||Fighter-reconnaissance||1919||Prototype||||
|-
|Bristol Bagshot||UK||Heavy fighter||1927||Prototype||||
|-
|Bristol Beaufighter||UK||Strike fighter||1939||Production||||
|-
|Bristol Blenheim||UK||Night fighter||1935||Production||||
|-
|Bristol Bulldog||UK||||1928||Production||||
|-
|Bristol Bullfinch||UK||||1922||Prototype||||
|-
|Bristol Bullpup||UK||||1928||Prototype||||
|-
|Bristol F.2 Fighter||UK||Two-seat fighter||1916||Production||||
|-
|Bristol Jupiter Fighter||UK||||1923||Prototype||||
|-
|Bristol M.1 Bullet||UK||||1916||Production||||
|-
|Bristol Scout||UK||||1914||Production||||
|-
|Bristol Scout F ||UK||||1918||Prototype||||
|-
|Bristol T.T.A.||UK||Zeppelin interceptor||1916||Prototype||||
|-
|Bristol Type 101||UK||Two-seat fighter||1927||Prototype||||
|-
|Bristol Type 123||UK||||1934||Prototype||||
|-
|Bristol Type 133||UK||||1934||Prototype||||
|-
|Bristol Type 146||UK||||1938||Prototype||||
|-
|British Aerospace Sea Harrier ||UK||Carrier V/STOL fighter||1978||Production||||
|-
|Burgess HT-B/HT-2 ||US||||1917||Production||||
|-
|Buscaylet-Bechereau BB.2||France||||1924||Prototype||||
|-
|Buscaylet-de Monge 5/2||France||||1923||Prototype||||
|-
|CAC Boomerang||Australia||||1942||Production||||
|-
|CAC CA-15 Kangaroo||Australia||||1946||Prototype||||
|-
|CAC Wirraway ||Australia||Emergency fighter/trainer||1935||Production||||
|-
|Canadian Car and Foundry FDB-1||Canada||||1938||Prototype||||
|-
|Caproni Ca.20||Italy||||1914||Prototype||||
|-
|Caproni Ca.70 & 71 ||Italy||Night fighter||1925||Prototype||||
|-
|Caproni Ca.114||Italy||||1933||Production||||
|-
|Caproni Ca.165||Italy||||1938||Prototype||||
|-
|Caproni Ca.301||Italy||||1934||Prototype||||
|-
|Caproni Ca.331||Italy||Night fighter||1942||Prototype||||
|-
|Caproni Ca.335||Italy||Fighter-bomber||1939||Prototype||||
|-
|Caproni CH.1||Italy||||1935||Prototype||||
|-
|Caproni Vizzola F.4||Italy||||1940||Prototype||||
|-
|Caproni Vizzola F.5||Italy||||1939||Production||||
|-
|Caproni Vizzola F.6||Italy||||1941||Prototype||||
|-
|Caudron O||France||||1917||Prototype||||
|-
|Caudron C.714||France||Lightweight fighter||1936||Production|| ca.||
|-
|Caudron R.11||France||Escort fighter||1916||Production|| ca.||
|-
|Caudron R.12||France||Escort fighter||1918||Prototype||||
|-
|Caudron R.14||France||Escort fighter||1918||Prototype||||
|-
|Caudron-Renault CR.760||France||Lightweight fighter||1940||Prototype||||
|-
|Caudron-Renault CR.770||France||Lightweight fighter||1940||Prototype||||
|-
|Chengdu FC-1 Xiaolong/PAC JF-17 Thunder||China, Pakistan||Lightweight fighter-bomber||2003||Operational||+||
|-
|Chengdu J-7||China||Fighter-bomber||1966||Operational||+||
|-
|Chengdu J-10||China||Lightweight fighter-bomber||1998||Operational||+||
|-
|Chengdu J-20||China||||2011||Operational||||
|-
|Christmas Bullet||US||||1919||Prototype||||
|-
|Chu XP-0||China||||1943||Prototype||||
|-
|Comte AC-1||Switzerland||||1927||Prototype||||
|-
|Consolidated PB-2/P-30 ||US||Two-seat fighter||1934||Production||||
|-
|Consolidated Vultee XP-81 ||US||Escort fighter||1945||Prototype||||
|-
|Convair XF-92||US||Interceptor||1948||Prototype||||
|-
|Convair F-102 Delta Dagger ||US||Interceptor||1953||Production||||
|-
|Convair F-106 Delta Dart ||US||Interceptor||1956||Production||||
|-
|Convair XFY Pogo ||US||VTOL fighter||1954||Prototype||||
|-
|Convair F2Y Sea Dart ||US||Flying-boat jet fighter||1953||Prototype||||
|-
|Courtois-Suffit Lescop CSL-1||France||||1918||Prototype||||
|-
|Curtiss 18||US||||1918||Production||||
|-
|Curtiss HA ||US||Floatplane fighter||1918||Prototype||||
|-
|Curtiss TS-1 and F4C-1||US||Carrier fighter||1922||Production||||
|-
|Curtiss BF2C Goshawk ||US||Carrier fighter-bomber||1933||Production||||
|-
|Curtiss F6C Hawk||US||Carrier fighter||1923||Production||||
|-
|Curtiss F7C Seahawk||US||Carrier fighter||1927||Production||||
|-
|Curtiss F8C Falcon/Helldiver ||US||Carrier fighter-bomber||1928||Production||||
|-
|Curtiss F9C Sparrowhawk ||US||Parasite fighter||1931||Production||||
|-
|Curtiss XF10C Helldiver ||US||Fighter-bomber||1932||Prototype||||
|-
|Curtiss F11C Goshawk||US||Carrier fighter||1932||Production||||
|-
|Curtiss F12C ||US||Carrier fighter-bomber||1933||Prototype||||
|-
|Curtiss XF13C||US||Carrier fighter||1934||Prototype||||
|-
|Curtiss XF14C||US||Carrier fighter||1943||Prototype||||
|-
|Curtiss XF15C ||US||Carrier fighter||1945||Prototype||||
|-
|Curtiss PW-8||US||||1923||Production||||
|-
|Curtiss P-1 Hawk||US||||1925||Production||||
|-
|Curtiss P-2 Hawk||US||||1925||Production||||
|-
|Curtiss P-3 Hawk/XP-21||US||||1928||Production||||
|-
|Curtiss P-5 Superhawk||US||||1928||Production||||
|-
|Curtiss P-6 Hawk||US||||1927||Production||||
|-
|Curtiss XP-10||US||||1928||Prototype||||
|-
|Curtiss YP-20||US||||1928||Prototype||||
|-
|Curtiss XP-31 Swift||US||||1933||Prototype||||
|-
|Curtiss P-36 Hawk||US||||1935||Production||||
|-
|Curtiss XP-37||US||||1939||Prototype||||
|-
|Curtiss P-40 Warhawk||US||||1938||Production||||
|-
|Curtiss XP-46||US||||1941||Prototype||||
|-
|Curtiss XP-53 & P-60||US||||1941||Prototype||||
|-
|Curtiss XP-62||US||Interceptor||1943||Prototype||||
|-
|Curtiss-Wright CW-21 ||US||Lightweight fighter||1938||Production||||
|-
|Curtiss-Wright XP-55 Ascender||US||||1943||Prototype||||
|-
|Curtiss-Wright XF-87 Blackhawk||US||All-weather interceptor||1948||Prototype||||
|-
|Daimler D.I||Germany||||1918||Prototype||||
|-
|Daimler L11||Germany||||1918||Prototype||||
|-
|Daimler L14||Germany||||1919||Prototype||||
|-
|Dassault Balzac V||France||VTOL fighter||1962||Prototype||||
|-
|Dassault Étendard II||France||||1956||Prototype||||
|-
|Dassault Étendard IV||France||Strike fighter||1958||Production||||
|-
|Dassault Étendard VI||France||Fighter-bomber||1957||Prototype||||
|-
|Dassault Mirage III||France||||1956||Operational||||
|-
|Dassault Mirage IIIV ||France||VTOL fighter||1965||Prototype||||
|-
|Dassault Mirage 5 & 50||France||Fighter-bomber||1967||Operational||||
|-
|Dassault Mirage 2000||France||Lightweight fighter-bomber||1978||Operational||||
|-
|Dassault Mirage 4000||France||Interceptor/fighter-bomber||1979||Prototype||||
|-
|Dassault Mirage F1||France||Fighter-bomber||1966||Operational||||
|-
|Dassault Mirage F2||France||Fighter-bomber||1966||Prototype||||
|-
|Dassault Mirage G||France||||1967||Prototype||||
|-
|Dassault Mystère||France||Fighter-bomber||1951||Production||||
|-
|Dassault Mystère IV||France||Fighter-bomber||1952||Production||||
|-
|Dassault Ouragan||France||Fighter-bomber||1949||Production||||
|-
|Dassault Rafale||France||||1986||Operational||||
|-
|Dassault Super Mystère||France||Fighter-bomber||1955||Production||||
|-
|Dassault-Breguet Super Étendard||France||Strike fighter||1974||Operational||||
|-
|Dayton-Wright XPS-1||US||||1923||Prototype||||
|-
|de Bruyère C.1 ||France||||1917||Prototype||||
|-
|de Havilland Dormouse||UK||||1924||Prototype||||
|-
|de Havilland DH.77||UK||Interceptor||1929||Prototype||||
|-
|de Havilland Hornet/Sea Hornet||UK||Heavy fighter||1944||Production||||
|-
|de Havilland Mosquito||UK||Fighter-bomber/night fighter||1941||Production||||
|-
|de Havilland Sea Venom||UK||Carrier fighter-bomber||1951||Production||||
|-
|de Havilland DH.110 Sea Vixen||UK||Carrier fighter||1951||Production||||
|-
|de Havilland Vampire/Sea Vampire||UK||||1943||Production||||
|-
|de Havilland Venom||UK||Fighter-bomber||1949||Production||||
|-
|De Marçay 2||France||||1918||Prototype||||
|-
|De Marçay 4||France||||1923||Prototype||||
|-
|de Monge M-101||France, Netherlands||Two-seat fighter||1924||Prototype||||
|-
|Descamps 27||France||||1918||Prototype||||
|-
|Dewoitine D.1||France||||1922||Production||||
|-
|Dewoitine D.8||France||||1923||Prototype||||
|-
|Dewoitine D.9||France||||1924||Production||||
|-
|Dewoitine D.12||France||||1925||Prototype||||
|-
|Dewoitine D.15||France||||1924||Prototype||||
|-
|Dewoitine D.19||France||||1925||Production||||
|-
|Dewoitine D.21 & D.53||France||||1925||Production||||
|-
|Dewoitine D.25 ||France||Two-seat fighter||1926||Production||||
|-
|Dewoitine D.27||France||||1928||Production||||
|-
|Dewoitine D.371||France||||1931||Production||||
|-
|Dewoitine D.500 & D.501||France||||1932||Production||||
|-
|Dewoitine D.510||France||||1934||Production||||
|-
|Dewoitine D.503/D.511||France||||1935||Prototype||||
|-
|Dewoitine D.513 & 514||France||||1936||Prototype||||
|-
|Dewoitine D.520||France||||1938||Production||||
|-
|Dewoitine D.535||France||||1932||Prototype||||
|-
|Dewoitine D.560 & D.570||France||||1932||Prototype||||
|-
|DFW Floh||Germany||||1915||Prototype||||
|-
|Díaz Type C||Spain||||1919||Prototype||||
|-
|Dobi-III||Lithuania||||1924||Prototype||||
|-
|Doflug D-3802||Switzerland||||1944||Production||||
|-
|Doflug D-3803||Switzerland||||1947||Prototype||||
|-
|Dornier Do H||Germany||||1922||Prototype||||
|-
|Dornier Do 10||Germany||Two-seat fighter||1931||Prototype||||
|-
|Dornier Do 17||Germany||Night fighter||1934||Production||||
|-
|Dornier Do 215||Germany||Night fighter||1938||Production||||
|-
|Dornier Do 217 ||Germany||Night fighter||1938||Production||||
|-
|Dornier Do 335||Germany||Heavy fighter||1943||Production||||
|-
|Douglas P-70 Havoc||US||Night fighter||1939||Production||||
|-
|Douglas XA-26A||US||Night fighter||1942||Prototype||||
|-
|Douglas XFD||US||Carrier fighter||1933||Prototype||||
|-
|Douglas F3D Skyknight||US||Carrier night fighter||1948||Production||||
|-
|Douglas F4D Skyray||US||Carrier fighter||1951||Production||||
|-
|Douglas F5D Skylancer||US||Carrier fighter||1956||Production||||
|-
|Ducrot SLD||Italy||||1918||Prototype||||
|-
|Dufaux avions-canon||Switzerland||Cannon fighter||1917||Prototype||||
|-
|Dufaux C.1||Switzerland||||1916||Prototype||||
|-
|Eberhart XFG & XF2G||US||Carrier fighter||1927||Prototype||||
|-
|EFW N-20||Switzerland||||1952||Prototype||||
|-
|ENAER Pantera||Chile||Fighter-bomber||1988||Operational||||
|-
|Engels MI||Russia||||1916||Production||||
|-
|Engineering Division PW-1||US||||1921||Prototype||||
|-
|Engineering Division TP-1 ||US||Two-seat fighter||1923||Prototype||||
|-
|English Electric Lightning||UK||Interceptor||1954||Production||||
|-
|Euler D.I||Germany||||1916||Production||||
|-
|Euler D.II||Germany||||1917||Production||||
|-
|Euler Dr 1||Germany||||1917||Prototype||||
|-
|Euler Dr 2||Germany||||1917||Prototype||||
|-
|Euler Dr 3||Germany||||1917||Prototype||||
|-
|Euler Gelber Hund||Germany||||1915||Prototype||||
|-
|Euler Vierdecker ||Germany||||1917||Prototype||||
|-
|Euler Versuchszweisitzer||Germany||Two-seat fighter||1915||Prototype||||
|-
|Eurofighter Typhoon||UK, Germany, Italy, Spain||Fighter-bomber||1994||Operational||||
|-
|Fairey F.2 ||UK||Long-range fighter||1917||Prototype||||
|-
|Fairey Fantôme||UK||||1935||Prototype||||
|-
|Fairey Fleetwing||UK||Fleet fighter||1929||Prototype||||
|-
|Fairey Flycatcher||UK||||1922||Production||||
|-
|Fairey Firefly ||UK||Fleet fighter||1941||Production||||
|-
|Fairey Firefly II||UK||||1929||Production||||
|-
|Fairey Fox ||UK||Fighter-reconnaissance||1929||Production|| ca.||
|-
|Fairey Fulmar ||UK||Fleet fighter||1940||Production||||
|-
|Fairey Hamble Baby ||UK||Floatplane fighter||1916||Production||||
|-
|Fairey Pintail ||UK||Floatplane fighter||1921||Production||||
|-
|Farman HF.30 ||France||Two-seat fighter||1916||Prototype||||
|-
|Farman F.31 ||France||Two-seat fighter||1918||Prototype||||
|-
|FBA Ca2 Avion-Canon||France||Cannon fighter||1916||Prototype||||
|-
|FFA P-16||Switzerland||||1955||Prototype||||
|-
|FFVS 22||Sweden||||1942||Production||||
|-
|FMA I.Ae. 27 Pulqui I||Argentina||||1947||Prototype||||
|-
|FMA I.Ae. 30 Ñancú||Argentina||Escort fighter||1948||Prototype||||
|-
|FMA I.Ae. 33 Pulqui II||Argentina||||1950||Prototype||||
|-
|Fiat CR.1/CR.2/CR.5/CR.10||Italy||||1924||Production||||
|-
|Fiat CR.20||Italy||||1926||Production||||
|-
|Fiat CR.25 ||Italy||Heavy fighter||1937||Production||||
|-
|Fiat CR.30||Italy||||1932||Production||||
|-
|Fiat CR.32/CR.33/CR.40/CR.41||Italy||||1933||Production||||
|-
|Fiat CR.42 Falco||Italy||||1938||Production||||
|-
|Fiat G.50 Freccia||Italy||||1937||Production||||
|-
|Fiat G.55/G.56/G.59 Centauro||Italy||||1942||Production||||
|-
|Fiat G.91 ||Italy||Strike fighter||1956||Production||||
|-
|Fisher P-75 Eagle||US||Heavy fighter||1943||Prototype||||
|-
|Focke-Wulf Fw 57||Germany||Fighter-bomber||1936||Prototype||||
|-
|Focke-Wulf Fw 159||Germany||||1935||Prototype||||
|-
|Focke-Wulf Fw 187 ||Germany||Heavy fighter||1937||Prototype||||
|-
|Focke-Wulf Fw 190||Germany||Fighter-bomber||1939||Production||+||
|-
|Focke-Wulf Ta 152||Germany||High-altitude interceptor||1944||Production||||
|-
|Focke-Wulf Ta 154 ||Germany||Night fighter||1943||Production||||
|-
|Fokker D.I||Germany||||1916||Production||||
|-
|Fokker D.II||Germany||||1916||Production||||
|-
|Fokker D.III||Germany||||1916||Production||||
|-
|Fokker D.IV||Germany||||1916||Production||||
|-
|Fokker D.V||Germany||||1916||Production||||
|-
|Fokker D.VI||Germany||||1918||Production||||
|-
|Fokker D.VII & V.34 & 36||Germany||||1918||Production||||
|-
|Fokker D.IX/PW-6||Netherlands||||1921||Prototype||||
|-
|Fokker D.X||Netherlands||||1918||Production||||
|-
|Fokker D.XI/PW-7||Netherlands||||1923||Production||||
|-
|Fokker D.XII||Netherlands||||1924||Prototype||||
|-
|Fokker D.XIII||Netherlands||||1924||Production||||
|-
|Fokker D.XIV||Netherlands||||1925||Prototype||||
|-
|Fokker D.XVI||Netherlands||||1929||Production||||
|-
|Fokker D.XVII||Netherlands||||1931||Prototype||||
|-
|Fokker D.XXI||Netherlands||||1936||Production||||
|-
|Fokker D.XXIII||Netherlands||||1939||Prototype||||
|-
|Fokker DC.I||Netherlands||||1923||Production||||
|-
|Fokker Dr.I||Germany||||1917||Production||||
|-
|Fokker E.I||Germany||||1915||Production||||
|-
|Fokker E.II||Germany||||1915||Production||||
|-
|Fokker E.III||Germany||||1915||Production||||
|-
|Fokker E.IV||Germany||||1915||Production||||
|-
|Fokker E.V/D.VIII||Germany||||1918||Production|| ca.||
|-
|Fokker G.I||Netherlands||||1937||Production||||
|-
|Fokker K.I ||Germany||Heavy fighter||1915||Prototype||||
|-
|Fokker M.16/B.III||Germany||||1915||Production||||
|-
|Fokker PW-5||Netherlands||||1921||Production||||
|-
|Fokker V.1||Germany||||1916||Prototype||||
|-
|Fokker V.2||Germany||||1916||Prototype||||
|-
|Fokker V.3||Germany||||1916||Prototype||||
|-
|Fokker V.4||Germany||||1916||Prototype||||
|-
|Fokker V.6||Germany||||1917||Prototype||||
|-
|Fokker V.7||Germany||||1918||Prototype||||
|-
|Fokker V.8||Germany||||1917||Prototype||||
|-
|Fokker V.17, V.20, V.23 & V.25||Germany||||1917||Prototype||||
|-
|Fokker V.27 & V.37 ||Germany||||1918||Prototype||||
|-
|Folland Gnat||UK||Lightweight fighter||1955||Production||||
|-
|Folland Midge||UK||Lightweight fighter||1954||Prototype||||
|-
|Friedrichshafen FF.43||Germany||||1916||Prototype||||
|-
|Friedrichshafen FF.46||Germany||||1916||Prototype||||
|-
|Friedrichshafen FF.54||Germany||||1917||Prototype|| ca.||
|-
|FVM J 23||Sweden||||1923||Production||||
|-
|FVM J 24||Sweden||||1924||Prototype||||
|-
|Gabardini G.8||Italy||||1923||Prototype||+||
|-
|Gabardini G.9||Italy||||1923||Prototype||+||
|-
|Galvin HC||France||Floatplane fighter||1919||Prototype||||
|-
|Geest Fighter||Germany||||1917||Prototype||||
|-
|General Aviation XFA||US||||1932||Prototype||||
|-
|General Dynamics F-16 Fighting Falcon||US||||1974||Operational||||
|-
|General Dynamics F-16XL||US||||1982||Prototype||||
|-
|General Dynamics/Grumman F-111B||US||Interceptor||1965||Prototype||||
|-
|Germania DB||Germany||Two-seat fighter||1915||Prototype||||
|-
|Germania JM||Germany||||1916||Prototype||||
|-
|Gloster E.1/44||UK||Jet||1948||Prototype||||
|-
|Gloster F.5/34||UK||||1937||Prototype||||
|-
|Gloster F.9/37||UK||||1939||Prototype||||
|-
|Gloster Gambet||UK, Japan||||1927||Production||||
|-
|Gloster Gamecock||UK||||1925||Production||||
|-
|Gloster Gauntlet||UK||||1933||Production||||
|-
|Gloster Gladiator & Sea Gladiator||UK||||1934||Production||||
|-
|Gloster Gnatsnapper||UK||Carrier fighter||1928||Prototype||||
|-
|Gloster Goldfinch||UK||||1927||Prototype||||
|-
|Gloster Gorcock||UK||||1925||Prototype||||
|-
|Gloster Grebe||UK||||1923||Production||||
|-
|Gloster Grouse||UK||||1923||Prototype||||
|-
|Gloster Guan||UK||||1926||Prototype||||
|-
|Gloster Javelin||UK||All-weather interceptor||1951||Production||||
|-
|Gloster Mars, Nightjar & Sparrowhawk||UK||||1921||Production||||
|-
|Gloster Meteor||UK||Jet||1943||Production||||
|-
|Goodyear F2G Corsair||US||||1945||Prototype||||
|-
|Gorbunov 105||USSR||||1943||Prototype||||
|-
|Gourdou-Leseurre Type A||France||||1918||Prototype||||
|-
|Gourdou-Leseurre Type B, GL.2/21/22/23/24||France||||1918||Production||+||
|-
|Gourdou-Leseurre GL.30 series||France||||1920||Production||+||
|-
|Gourdou-Leseurre GL.40, 410 & 450||France||||1932||Prototype||||
|-
|Gourdou-Leseurre GL.50||France||||1922||Prototype||||
|-
|Gourdou-Leseurre GL.482||France||||1933||Prototype||||
|-
|Grigorovich I-1||USSR||||1924||Prototype||||
|-
|Grigorovich I-2 & I-2bis||USSR||||1924||Production||||
|-
|Grigorovich DI-3||USSR||||1931||Prototype||||
|-
|Grigorovich I-Z||USSR||||1931||Production||||
|-
|Grigorovich IP-1||USSR||Cannon fighter||1935||Production||||
|-
|Grigorovich IP-4||USSR||Cannon fighter||1934||Prototype||||
|-
|Grumman FF/G-5/G-23 Goblin||US||Carrier fighter||1931||Production||||
|-
|Grumman F2F||US||Carrier fighter||1933||Production||||
|-
|Grumman F3F||US||Carrier fighter||1935||Production||||
|-
|Grumman F4F Wildcat||US||Carrier fighter||1937||Production||||
|-
|Grumman XF5F Skyrocket||US||Carrier interceptor||1940||Prototype||||
|-
|Grumman F6F Hellcat||US||Carrier fighter||1942||Production||||
|-
|Grumman F7F Tigercat||US||Carrier heavy fighter||1943||Production||||
|-
|Grumman F8F Bearcat||US||Carrier fighter-bomber||1944||Production||||
|-
|Grumman F9F Panther||US||Carrier fighter-bomber||1947||Production||||
|-
|Grumman F-9 Cougar||US||Carrier fighter||1951||Production||||
|-
|Grumman XF10F Jaguar||US||Carrier fighter||1952||Prototype||||
|-
|Grumman F-11 Tiger||US||Carrier fighter||1954||Production||||
|-
|Grumman F-14 Tomcat||US||Carrier interceptor||1970||Operational|||| 
|-
|Grumman XP-50||US||||1941||Prototype||||
|-
|Grumman GG||US||||1934||Prototype||||
|-
|Grumman SF/G-6||US||Carrier fighter||1932||Production||||
|-
|Gudkov GU-1||USSR||||1943||Prototype||||
|-
|Gudkov GU-82||USSR||||1941||Prototype||||
|-
|Guizhou JL-9||China||||2003||Operational||+||
|-
|Häfeli DH-4||Switzerland||||1918||Prototype||||
|-
|HAL Ajeet||India, UK||Lightweight fighter||1976||Production||||
|-
|HAL HF-24 Marut||India||Fighter-bomber||1961||Production||||
|-
|HAL Tejas Mk1/Mk1A||India||Lightweight fighter-bomber||2001||Operational||||
|-
|HAL Tejas Mk2||India||Fighter-bomber||2019||Project||||
|-
|HAL TEDBF||India||Carrier fighter-bomber||2020||Project||||
|-
|HAL AMCA||India||Fighter-bomber||2019||Project||||
|-
|Halberstadt D.I||Germany||||1915||Prototype||||
|-
|Halberstadt D.II - D.V||Germany||||1915||Production||||
|-
|Hall XFH||US||Carrier fighter||1929||Prototype||||
|-
|Handley Page Type S||UK||||1923||Prototype||||
|-
|Hannover CL.II||Germany||Escort fighter||1917||Production||||
|-
|Hanriot HD.1||France||||1916||Production||||
|-
|Hanriot HD.2||France||Floatplane fighter||1917||Production|| ca.||
|-
|Hanriot HD.3||France||||1917||Production|| ca.||
|-
|Hanriot HD.5||France||Two-seat fighter||1918||Prototype||||
|-
|Hanriot HD.6||France||Two-seat fighter||1919||Prototype||||
|-
|Hanriot HD.7||France||||1918||Prototype||||
|-
|Hanriot HD.8||France||||1918||Prototype||||
|-
|Hanriot HD.12||France||||1921||Prototype||||
|-
|Hanriot HD.15||France||High-altitude fighter||1922||Prototype||||
|-
|Hanriot HD.20||France||Shipboard fighter||1923||Prototype||||
|-
|Hanriot H.26||France||||1923||Prototype||||
|-
|Hanriot H.31||France||||1925||Prototype||||
|-
|Hanriot H.33||France||Two-seat fighter||1926||Prototype||||
|-
|Hanriot H.110 & H.115||France||||1933||Prototype||||
|-
|Hanriot H.220, H.220-2 & SNCAC NC-600||France||Heavy fighter||1937||Prototype||||
|-
|Hansa-Brandenburg CC||Germany||Flying boat fighter||1916||Production||||
|-
|Hansa-Brandenburg D.I||Austria-Hungary||||1916||Production||||
|-
|Hansa-Brandenburg KDW||Germany||Floatplane fighter||1916||Production|| ca.||
|-
|Hansa-Brandenburg KF||Germany||||1916||Prototype||||
|-
|Hansa-Brandenburg L.14||Austria-Hungary||||1917||Prototype||||
|-
|Hansa-Brandenburg L.16||Austria-Hungary||||1917||Prototype||||
|-
|Hansa-Brandenburg W.11||Germany||Floatplane fighter||1917||Prototype||||
|-
|Hansa-Brandenburg W.12||Germany||Floatplane fighter||1917||Production||||
|-
|Hansa-Brandenburg W.16||Germany||Floatplane fighter||1917||Prototype||||
|-
|Hansa-Brandenburg W.17||Germany||Flying-boat fighter||1917||Prototype||||
|-
|Hansa-Brandenburg W.18||Germany||Flying-boat fighter||1917||Production||||
|-
|Hansa-Brandenburg W.19||Germany||Floatplane fighter||1918||Production||||
|-
|Hansa-Brandenburg W.25||Germany||Floatplane fighter||1917||Prototype||||
|-
|Hansa-Brandenburg W.27||Germany||Floatplane fighter||1918||Prototype||||
|-
|Hansa-Brandenburg W.29/W.33||Germany||Floatplane fighter||1918||Production||+||
|-
|Hansa-Brandenburg W.32||Germany||Floatplane fighter||1918||Prototype||||
|-
|Hawker Demon||UK||||1931||Production||||
|-
|Hawker F.20/27||UK||||1928||Prototype||||
|-
|Hawker Fury||UK||||1931||Production||||
|-
|Hawker Fury (monoplane)||UK||||1944||Prototype||||
|-
|Hawker Hart Fighter||UK||||1931||Production||||
|-
|Hawker Hawfinch||UK||||1927||Prototype||||
|-
|Hawker Heron||UK||||1925||Prototype||||
|-
|Hawker Hoopoe||UK||||1928||Prototype||||
|-
|Hawker Hornbill||UK||||1925||Prototype||||
|-
|Hawker Hotspur||UK||Turret fighter||1938||Prototype||||
|-
|Hawker Hunter||UK||Fighter-bomber||1951||Production||||
|-
|Hawker Hurricane & Sea Hurricane||UK||Fighter-bomber||1935||Production||||
|-
|Hawker Siddeley Kestrel FGA.1||UK||V/STOL Fighter-bomber||1964||Production||||
|-
|Hawker Nimrod||UK||Carrier fighter||1931||Production||||
|-
|Hawker Osprey||UK||Fleet fighter/reconnaissance||1930||Production||||
|-
|Hawker P.1081||UK||||1950||Prototype||||
|-
|Hawker P.V.3||UK||Day & night fighter||1934||Prototype||||
|-
|Hawker Sea Fury||UK||Carrier fighter||1945||Production||||
|-
|Hawker Sea Hawk||UK||Carrier jet fighter||1947||Production||||
|-
|Hawker Tempest||UK||||1942||Production||||
|-
|Hawker Tornado||UK||||1939||Prototype||||
|-
|Hawker Typhoon||UK||Fighter-bomber||1940||Production||||
|-
|Hawker Woodcock/Danecock/Dankok||UK||||1923||Production||||
|-
|Heinkel HD 23||Germany||||1926||Prototype||||
|-
|Heinkel HD 37||Germany||||1928||Production||||
|-
|Heinkel HD 38||Germany||||1928||Production||||
|-
|Heinkel HD 43||Germany||||1931||Prototype||||
|-
|Heinkel He 49||Germany||||1932||Prototype||||
|-
|Heinkel He 51||Germany||||1933||Production||||
|-
|Heinkel He 74||Germany||Lightweight fighter||1933||Prototype||||
|-
|Heinkel He 100/He 113||Germany||||1938||Prototype||||
|-
|Heinkel He 112||Germany||||1935||Production||||
|-
|Heinkel He 162 Volksjäger||Germany||||1944||Production||||
|-
|Heinkel He 219||Germany||Night fighter||1942||Production||||
|-
|Heinkel He 280||Germany||||1940||Prototype||||
|-
|Heinrich Pursuit||US||||1917||Prototype||||
|-
|Helwan HA-300||Egypt||||1964||Prototype||||
|-
|Henschel Hs 124||Germany||Heavy fighter||1936||Prototype||||
|-
|HESA Azarakhsh||Iran||||1997||Operational||||
|-
|HESA Saeqeh||Iran||||2004||Operational||||
|-
|Hispano Aviación HA-1112||Spain, Germany||||1951||Production||||
|-
|Hispano Barrón||Spain||||1919||Prototype||||
|-
|Horten Ho 229||Germany||Fighter-bomber jet flying wing||1944||Prototype||||
|-
|Hughes D-2||US||fighter-bomber||1943||Prototype||||
|-
|IAI Kfir||Israel||||1973||Operational||||
|-
|IAI Lavi||Israel||||1986||Prototype||||
|-
|IAI Nammer||Israel||||1991||Prototype||||
|-
|IAI Nesher/Dagger||Israel||||1971||Production||||
|-
|IAR-11||Romania||||1930||Prototype||||
|-
|IAR-12||Romania||||1933||Prototype||||
|-
|IAR-13||Romania||||1933||Prototype||||
|-
|IAR-14||Romania||||1933||Production||||
|-
|IAR-15||Romania||||1933||Prototype||||
|-
|IAR-16||Romania||||1934||Prototype||||
|-
|IAR-80||Romania||||1939||Production||||
|-
|Ikarus IK-2||Yugoslavia||||1935||Production||||
|-
|Ikarus S-49||Yugoslavia||||1949||Production||||
|-
|Ilyushin I-21/TsKB-32||USSR||||1936||Prototype||||
|-
|Ilyushin Il-1||USSR||||1944||Prototype||||
|-
|Ilyushin Il-2I||USSR||||1939||Prototype||||
|-
|IMAM Ro.41||Italy||||1934||Production||||
|-
|IMAM Ro.44||Italy||Floatplane fighter||1936||Production||||
|-
|IMAM Ro.51||Italy||||1937||Prototype||||
|-
|IMAM Ro.57||Italy||Interceptor/ground attack||1939||Production||||
|-
|IMAM Ro.58||Italy||fighter-bomber||1942||Prototype||||
|-
|IVL C.24||Finland||||1924||Prototype||||
|-
|IVL C.VI.25||Finland||||1925||Prototype||||
|-
|IVL Haukka||Finland||||1927||Prototype||||
|-
|Junkers CL.I||Germany||||1917||Production||||
|-
|Junkers EF 126||Germany||||1947||Prototype||||
|-	
|Junkers J 2||Germany||||1916||Prototype||||
|-
|Junkers J 7||Germany||||1917||Prototype||||
|-
|Junkers J 9/D.I||Germany||||1917||Production||||
|-
|Junkers T.22||Germany||||1923||Prototype||||
|-
|Junkers K 47||Germany||||1929||Production||||
|-
|Junkers Ju 88||Germany||Night fighter||1936||Production|| ca.||
|-
|Junkers Ju 388||Germany||Night fighter||1943||Production||||
|-
|KAI KF-21 Boramae||South Korea, Indonesia||||2021||Prototype||||
|-
|Kasyanenko KPI-5||Russia||||1917||Prototype||||
|-
|Kawanishi N1K Kyofu||Japan||Floatplane fighter||1942||Production||||
|-
|Kawanishi N1K-J Shiden||Japan||Interceptor||1942||Production||||
|-
|Kawanishi K-11||Japan||Carrier fighter||1927||Prototype||||
|-
|Kawasaki KDA-3||Japan||||1928||Prototype||||
|-
|Kawasaki KDA-5 Army Type 92||Japan||||1930||Production||||
|-
|Kawasaki Ki-5||Japan||||1934||Prototype||||
|-
|Kawasaki Ki-10||Japan||||1935||Production||||
|-
|Kawasaki Ki-28||Japan||||1936||Prototype||||
|-
|Kawasaki Ki-45||Japan||Interceptor||1941||Production||||
|-
|Kawasaki Ki-60||Japan||||1941||Prototype||||
|-
|Kawasaki Ki-61||Japan||||1941||Production||||
|-
|Kawasaki Ki-64||Japan||Interceptor||1943||Prototype||||
|-
|Kawasaki Ki-96||Japan||||1943||Prototype||||
|-
|Kawasaki Ki-100||Japan||||1945||Production||||
|-
|Kawasaki Ki-102 & Ki-108||Japan||||1944||Production||||
|-
|Kochyerigin DI-6||USSR||||1934||Production||||
|-
|Kondor D.I||Germany||||1918||Prototype||||
|-
|Kondor D.II||Germany||||1918||Prototype||||
|-
|Kondor D.VI||Germany||||1918||Prototype||||
|-
|Kondor D.VII||Germany||||1917||Prototype||||
|-
|Koolhoven F.K.55||Netherlands||||1938||Prototype||||
|-
|Koolhoven F.K.58||Netherlands||||1938||Production||||
|-
|Kyushu J7W||Japan||||1945||Prototype||||
|-
|Laville DI-4||USSR||||1932||Prototype||||
|-
|Lavochkin-Gorbunov-Gudkov LaGG-1||USSR||||1940||Production||||
|-
|Lavochkin-Gorbunov-Gudkov LaGG-3||USSR||||1940||Production||||
|-
|Lavochkin La-5||USSR||||1942||Production||||
|-
|Lavochkin La-7||USSR||||1944||Production||||
|-
|Lavochkin La-9||USSR||||1946||Production||||
|-
|Lavochkin La-11||USSR||||1947||Production||||
|-
|Lavochkin La-15||USSR||||1948||Production||||
|-
|Lavochkin La-126||USSR||||1945||Prototype||||
|-
|Lavochkin La-150||USSR||||1946||Prototype||||
|-
|Lavochkin La-152||USSR||||1946||Prototype||||
|-
|Lavochkin La-156||USSR||||1947||Prototype||||
|-
|Lavochkin La-160||USSR||||1947||Prototype||||
|-
|Lavochkin La-168||USSR||||1948||Prototype||||
|-
|Lavochkin La-176||USSR||||1948||Prototype||||
|-
|Lavochkin La-190||USSR||||1951||Prototype||||
|-
|Lavochkin La-200||USSR||||1949||Prototype||||
|-
|Lavochkin La-250||USSR||||1956||Prototype||||
|-
|Letov Š-3||Czechoslovakia||||1922||Prototype||||
|-
|Letov Š-4||Czechoslovakia||||1922||Production||||
|-
|Letov Š-7||Czechoslovakia||||1923||Prototype||||
|-
|Letov Š-12||Czechoslovakia||||1924||Prototype||||
|-
|Letov Š-13||Czechoslovakia||||1924||Prototype||||
|-
|Letov Š-14||Czechoslovakia||||1924||Prototype||||
|-
|Letov Š-20||Czechoslovakia||||1925||Production||||
|-
|Letov Š-22||Czechoslovakia||||1926||Prototype||||
|-
|Letov Š-31||Czechoslovakia||||1929||Production||||
|-
|Letov Š-231||Czechoslovakia||||1933||Production||||
|-
|Levasseur PL.5||France||Carrier fighter||1924||Production||||
|-
|Levasseur PL.6||France||Two-seat fighter||1926||Prototype||||
|-
|Levy-Biche LB.2 & LB.6||France||Shipboard fighter||1927||Production||||
|-
|LFG Roland D.II||Germany||||1916||Production||||
|-
|LFG Roland D.III||Germany||||1916||Production|| ca.||
|-
|LFG Roland D.VI||Germany||||1917||Production||||
|-
|Lioré et Olivier LeO 7||France||Escort fighter||1922||Production||||
|-
|Liuchow Kwangsi Type 3||China||||1937||Prototype||||
|-
|Lloyd 40.15||Austria-Hungary||||1918||Prototype||||
|-
|Lloyd 40.16||Austria-Hungary||||1918||Prototype||||
|-
|Lockheed YP-24||US||||1931||Prototype||||
|-
|Lockheed P-38 Lightning||US||||1939||Production||||
|-
|Lockheed XP-49||US||||1942||Prototype||||
|-
|Lockheed XP-58 Chain Lightning||US||||1944||Prototype||||
|-
|Lockheed P-80 Shooting Star||US||||1944||Production||||
|-
|Lockheed XF-90||US||||1949||Prototype||||
|-
|Lockheed F-94/F-97 Starfire||US||||1949||Production||||
|-
|Lockheed F-104 Starfighter||US||||1954||Production||||
|-
|Lockheed YF-12||US||||1963||Prototype||||
|-
|Lockheed Martin F-22 Raptor||US||||1997||Operational||||
|-
|Lockheed Martin F-35 Lightning II||US||||2006||Operational||+||
|-
|Lockheed XFV||US||VTOL fighter||1953||Prototype||||
|-
|Loening M-8||US||||1918||Production||||
|-
|Loening PA-1||US||||1922||Prototype||||
|-
|Loening PW-2||US||||1918||Production||||
|-
|Lohner 10.20 Spuckerl||Austria-Hungary||||1916||Prototype||||
|-
|Lohner Type AA||Austria-Hungary||||1917||Prototype||||
|-
|Lohner Type A/Dr.I||Austria-Hungary||||1917||Prototype||||
|-
|Loire 43||France||||1932||Prototype||||
|-
|Loire 45||France||||1933||Prototype||||
|-
|Loire 46||France||||1934||Production||||
|-
|Loire 210||France||||1935||Production||||
|-
|Loire 250||France||||1935||Prototype||||
|-
|Loire-Nieuport LN.160, 161 & SNCAO 161||France||||1935||Prototype||||
|-
|Loring C-1||Spain||||1927||Prototype||||
|-
|LVG E.I||Germany||||1915||Prototype||||
|-
|LVG D 10||Germany||||1916||Prototype||||
|-
|LVG D.II||Germany||||1916||Prototype||||
|-
|LVG D.III||Germany||||1917||Prototype||||
|-
|LVG D.IV||Germany||||1918||Prototype||||
|-
|LVG D.V||Germany||||1918||Prototype||||
|-
|LVG D.VI||Germany||||1918||Prototype||||
|-
|Macchi C.200||Italy||||1937||Production||||
|-
|Macchi C.201||Italy||||1940||Prototype||||
|-
|Macchi C.202||Italy||||1940||Production||||
|-
|Macchi C.205||Italy||||1942||Production||||
|-
|Macchi M.5||Italy||Flying-boat fighter||1917||Production||||
|-
|Macchi M.6||Italy||Flying-boat fighter||1917||Prototype||||
|-
|Macchi M.7||Italy||Flying-boat fighter||1918||Production||+||
|-
|Macchi M.14||Italy||||1918||Production||||
|-
|Macchi M.26||Italy||Flying-boat fighter||1924||Prototype||||
|-
|Macchi M.41 & M.41bis||Italy||Flying-boat fighter||1927||Production||||
|-
|Macchi M.71||Italy||Flying-boat fighter||1930||Production|| ca.||
|-
|Mann Egerton Type H||UK||Shipboard fighter||1917||Prototype||||
|-
|Mann & Grimmer M.1 Two-seat fighter||UK||||1915||Prototype||||
|-
|Marchetti MVT/SIAI S.50||Italy||||1919||Prototype||||
|-
|Marinens Flyvebaatfabrikk M.F.9||Norway||||1925||Production||||
|-
|Mark D.I||Germany||||1918||Prototype||||
|-
|Martin-Baker MB 2||UK||||1938||Prototype||||
|-
|Martin-Baker MB 3||UK||||1942||Prototype||||
|-
|Martin-Baker MB 5||UK||||1944||Prototype||||
|-
|Martinsyde F.1||UK||||1917||Prototype||||
|-
|Martinsyde Buzzard||UK||||1918||Production||+||
|-
|Martinsyde G.100||UK||Fighter-bomber||1916||Production||||
|-
|MÁVAG Héja||Hungary||||1940||Production||||
|-
|McDonnell XP-67||US||Interceptor||1944||Prototype||||
|-
|McDonnell XF-85 Goblin||US||Parasite fighter||1948||Prototype||||
|-
|McDonnell XF-88||US||Escort fighter||1948||Prototype||||
|-
|McDonnell F-101 Voodoo||US||Fighter-bomber||1954||Production||||
|-
|McDonnell Douglas AV-8B Harrier II Plus||US, UK||||1993||Operational||||
|-
|McDonnell Douglas F-15 Eagle||style=white-space:nowrap|US||Interceptor||1972||Operational||||
|-
|McDonnell Douglas F-15E Strike Eagle||US||Fighter-bomber||1986||Operational||||
|-
|McDonnell Douglas F/A-18 Hornet||US||Carrier fighter-bomber||1978||Operational||||
|-
|McDonnell FH Phantom||US||Carrier fighter||1945||Production||||
|-
|McDonnell F2H Banshee||US||Carrier fighter-bomber||1947||Production||||
|-
|McDonnell F3H Demon||US||Carrier interceptor||1951||Production||||
|-
|McDonnell Douglas F4H/F-110/F-4 Phantom II||US||Carrier fighter-bomber||1958||Operational||||
|-
|Messerschmitt Bf 109||Germany||||1935||Production||||
|-
|Messerschmitt Bf 110||Germany||Heavy fighter||1936||Production||||
|-
|Messerschmitt Me 163||Germany||Interceptor rocket||1941||Production||||
|-
|Messerschmitt Me 209 (1943)||Germany||||1943||Prototype||||
|-
|Messerschmitt Me 210||Germany||Heavy fighter||1939||Production||||
|-
|Messerschmitt Me 262/Avia S-92||Germany||Fighter-bomber jet||1941||Production||||
|-
|Messerschmitt Me 263||Germany||Interceptor rocket||1945||Prototype||||
|-
|Messerschmitt Me 309||Germany||||1942||Prototype||||
|-
|Messerschmitt Me 310||Germany||Heavy fighter||1943||Prototype||||
|-
|Messerschmitt Me 328||Germany||Parasite fighter||1944||Prototype||||
|-
|Messerschmitt Me 410||Germany||Heavy fighter||1942||Production|| ca.||
|-
|Mikhelson/Korvin MK-1 Rybka||USSR||Floatplane fighter||1923||Prototype||||
|-
|Mikoyan-Gurevich I-210||USSR||||1941||Prototype||||
|-
|Mikoyan-Gurevich I-211||USSR||||1943||Prototype||||
|-
|Mikoyan-Gurevich I-220||USSR||||1943||Prototype||||
|-
|Mikoyan-Gurevich I-221||USSR||||1943||Prototype||||
|-
|Mikoyan-Gurevich I-222||USSR||||1944||Prototype||||
|-
|Mikoyan-Gurevich I-224||USSR||||1944||Prototype||||
|-
|Mikoyan-Gurevich I-225||USSR||||1944||Prototype||||
|-
|Mikoyan-Gurevich I-230||USSR||||1942||Prototype||||
|-
|Mikoyan-Gurevich I-231||USSR||||1943||Prototype||||
|-
|Mikoyan-Gurevich I-250||USSR||Mixed power||1945||Prototype||||
|-
|Mikoyan-Gurevich I-70 & 270||USSR||||1946||Prototype||||
|-
|Mikoyan-Gurevich I-320||USSR||||1949||Prototype||||
|-
|Mikoyan-Gurevich I-370/I-1/I-2||USSR||||1955||Prototype||||
|-
|Mikoyan-Gurevich I-380/I-3||USSR||||1956||Prototype||||
|-
|Mikoyan-Gurevich I-75||USSR||||1958||Prototype||||
|-
|Mikoyan-Gurevich MiG-1||USSR||||1940||Production||||
|-
|Mikoyan-Gurevich MiG-3||USSR||||1940||Production||||
|-
|Mikoyan-Gurevich MiG-5/DIS||USSR||Escort fighter||1941||Prototype||||
|-
|Mikoyan-Gurevich MiG-7||USSR||||1941||Prototype||||
|-
|Mikoyan-Gurevich MiG-9||USSR||||1946||Production||||
|-
|Mikoyan-Gurevich MiG-15||USSR||||1947||Production||||
|-
|Mikoyan-Gurevich MiG-17||USSR||||1950||Production||||
|-
|Mikoyan-Gurevich MiG-19||USSR||||1953||Production||||
|-
|Mikoyan-Gurevich MiG-21||USSR||||1955||Operational||||
|-
|Mikoyan-Gurevich MiG-21PD||USSR||VTOL fighter||1966||Prototype||||
|-
|Mikoyan-Gurevich MiG-23PD||USSR||VTOL fighter||1967||Prototype||||
|-
|Mikoyan-Gurevich MiG-23||USSR||Fighter-bomber||1967||Operational||||
|-
|Mikoyan-Gurevich MiG-25||USSR||Interceptor||1964||Operational||||
|-
|Mikoyan MiG-29||USSR||||1977||Operational||||
|-
|Mikoyan MiG-31||USSR||Interceptor||1975||Operational||||
|-
|Mikoyan MiG-35||Russia||||2007||Operational||||
|-
|Mikoyan-Gurevich SM-12||USSR||||1957||Prototype||||
|-
|Mikoyan-Gurevich Ye-150 & Ye-152||USSR||||1959||Prototype||||
|-
|Mikoyan-Gurevich Ye-8||USSR||||1962||Prototype||||
|-
|Mikoyan Project 1.44||Russia||||2000||Prototype||||
|-
|Miles M.20||UK||||1940||Prototype||||
|-
|Miles M.35 Libellula||UK||||1942||Prototype||||
|-
|Miles Master Fighter||UK||||1940||Production||||
|-
|Militär-Apparat MA-7||Switzerland||||1925||Prototype||||
|-
|Mitsubishi 1MF||Japan||||1921||Production||||
|-
|Mitsubishi 1MF2||Japan||||1928||Prototype||||
|-
|Mitsubishi 1MF9||Japan||||1927||Prototype||||
|-
|Mitsubishi 1MF10||Japan||Carrier fighter||1933||Prototype||||
|-
|Mitsubishi A5M||Japan||||1935||Production||||
|-
|Mitsubishi A6M Zero||Japan||||1939||Production||||
|-
|Mitsubishi A7M||Japan||||1944||Prototype||||
|-
|Mitsubishi X-2 Shinshin||Japan||||2016||Prototype||||
|-
|Mitsubishi F-1||Japan||||1975||Production||||
|-
|Mitsubishi F-2||Japan, US||||1995||Operational||||
|-
|Mitsubishi F-X||Japan, US||||2020||Project||||
|-
|Mitsubishi G6M ||Japan||Heavy fighter||1940||Production||||
|-
|Mitsubishi J2M||Japan||||1942||Production||||
|-
|Mitsubishi J8M/Ki-200||Japan||||1945||Prototype||||
|-
|Mitsubishi Ka-8||Japan||Carrier fighter||1934||Prototype||||
|-
|Mitsubishi Ki-18||Japan||||1935||Prototype||||
|-
|Mitsubishi Ki-33||Japan||||1936||Prototype||||
|-
|Mitsubishi Ki-46-III KAI||Japan||Heavy fighter (conversion)||1944||Production|| ca.||
|-
|Mitsubishi Ki-83||Japan||Heavy fighter||1944||Prototype||||
|-
|Mitsubishi Ki-109||Japan||Heavy day/night fighter||1942||Production||||
|-
|Morane-Saulnier L/Pfalz E.III||France||||1914||Production||||
|-
|Morane-Saulnier N||France||||1915||Production||||
|-
|Morane-Saulnier I||France||||1916||Production||||
|-
|Morane-Saulnier V||France||||1916||Production|| ca.||
|-
|Morane-Saulnier AC||France||||1916||Production|| ca.||
|-
|Morane-Saulnier AF||France||||1917||Prototype||||
|-
|Morane-Saulnier AI||France||||1917||Production||||
|-
|Morane-Saulnier AN series||France||||1918||Prototype||||
|-
|Morane-Saulnier M.S.121||France||||1927||Prototype||||
|-
|Morane-Saulnier M.S.225||France||||1932||Production||||
|-
|Morane-Saulnier M.S.325||France||||1933||Prototype||||
|-
|Morane-Saulnier M.S.405||France||||1935||Prototype||||
|-
|Morane-Saulnier M.S.406||France||||1935||Production|| ca.||
|-
|Morane-Saulnier M.S.410||France||||1940||Production||||
|-
|Mosca-Bystritsky MBbis||Russia||||1916||Production||||
|-
|Moskalyev SAM-13||USSR||||1940||Prototype||||
|-
|Nakajima A2N||Japan||||1929||Production||||
|-
|Nakajima A4N||Japan||||1934||Production||||
|-
|Nakajima A6M2-N||Japan||Floatplane fighter||1941||Production||||
|-
|Nakajima Army Type 91 Fighter||Japan||||1928||Production||||
|-
|Nakajima C6N-1S||Japan||Night fighter||1943||Prototype||||
|-
|Nakajima J1N||Japan||Night fighter||1941||Production||||
|-
|Nakajima J5N||Japan||Interceptor||1944||Prototype||||
|-
|Nakajima Ki-8||Japan||||1934||Prototype||||
|-
|Nakajima Ki-11||Japan||||1934||Prototype||||
|-
|Nakajima Ki-12 & PE||Japan||||1936||Prototype||||
|-
|Nakajima Ki-27||Japan||||1936||Production||||
|-
|Nakajima Ki-43 Hayabusa||Japan||||1938||Production||||
|-
|Nakajima Ki-44 Shoki||Japan||||1940||Production||||
|-
|Nakajima Ki-58||Japan||Escort fighter||1939||Prototype||||
|-
|Nakajima Ki-84 Hayate||Japan||||1943||Production||||
|-
|Nakajima Ki-87||Japan||||1945||Prototype||||
|-
|Nakajima Ki-116||Japan||||1945||Prototype||||
|-
|Nakajima Kikka||Japan||||1945||Prototype||||
|-
|Nakajima NAF-1||Japan||Carrier fighter||1933||Prototype||||
|-
|Nakajima NAF-2||Japan||Carrier fighter||1934||Prototype||||
|-
|Nanchang J-12||China||||1970||Prototype||||
|-
|Nielsen & Winther Type AA||Denmark||||1917||Production||||
|-
|Nieuport 10||France||||1914||Production|| ca.||
|-
|Nieuport 11||France||||1915||Production|| ca.||
|-
|Nieuport 16||France||||1916||Production|| ca.||
|-
|Nieuport 17, 21 & 23||France||||1916||Production|| ca.||
|-
|Nieuport 17bis & 23bis||France||||1917||Production|| ca.||
|-
|Nieuport 24 & 24bis||France||||1917||Production|| ca.||
|-
|Nieuport 25 & 27||France||||1917||Production|| ca.||
|-
|Nieuport 28||France||||1917||Production||||
|-
|Nieuport-Delage NiD 29||France||||1918||Production|| ca.||
|-
|Nieuport Nie 31RH||France||||1919||Prototype||||
|-
|Nieuport-Delage NiD 32RH||France||Shipboard fighter||1919||Production||||
|-
|Nieuport-Delage NiD 37||France||High-altitude fighter||1923||Prototype||||
|-
|Nieuport-Delage NiD 40||France||High-altitude fighter||1923||Prototype||||
|-
|Nieuport-Delage NiD 42||France||||1924||Production||||
|-
|Nieuport-Delage NiD 43||France||Floatplane fighter||1924||Prototype||||
|-
|Nieuport-Delage NiD 48, 48bis & 481||France||Lightweight Jockey fighter||1926||Prototype||||
|-
|Nieuport-Delage NiD 52||France||||1927||Production||||
|-
|Nieuport-Delage NiD 62||France||||1928||Production||||
|-
|Nieuport-Delage NiD 622||France||||1930||Production||||
|-
|Nieuport-Delage NiD 626||France||||1932||Production||||
|-
|Nieuport-Delage NiD 628||France||High-altitude fighter||1932||Prototype||||
|-
|Nieuport-Delage NiD 629||France||||1932||Production||||
|-
|Nieuport-Delage NiD 72||France||||1928||Production||||
|-
|Nieuport-Delage NiD 82||France||||1930||Prototype||||
|-
|Nieuport-Delage NiD 120 - NiD 125||France||||1932||Production||||
|-
|Nieuport Nighthawk\Gloster Nighthawk||UK||||1919||Production||||
|-
|Nikitin-Shevchenko IS||USSR||Polymorphic fighter||1940||Prototype||||
|-
|North American NA-50 & P-64||US||||1939||Production||||
|-
|North American P-51 Mustang||US||||1940||Production||||
|-
|North American P-82/F-82 Twin Mustang||US||||1945||Production||||
|-
|North American/Canadair/CAC F-86 Sabre|||US||||1947||Production||||
|-
|North American F-86D Sabre|||US||||1949||Production||||
|-
|North American FJ-1 Fury||US||||1946||Production||||
|-
|North American FJ-2/-3 Fury||US||||1951||Production||||
|-
|North American FJ-4 Fury||US||||1954||Production||||
|-
|North American YF-93||US||||1950||Prototype||||
|-
|North American F-100 Super Sabre||US||||1953||Production||||
|-
|North American F-107||US||||1956||Prototype||||
|-
|Northrop XFT||US||||1933||Prototype||||
|-
|Northrop XP-56 Black Bullet||US||||1943||Prototype||||
|-
|Northrop P-61 Black Widow||US||||1942||Production||||
|-
|Northrop XP-79||US||||1945||Prototype||||
|-
|Northrop F-89 Scorpion||US||||1948||Production||||
|-
|Northrop F-5||US||||1959||Operational||||
|-
|Northrop YF-17||US||||1974||Prototype||||
|-
|Northrop F-20 Tigershark||US||||1982||Prototype||||
|-
|Northrop YF-23||US||||1990||Prototype||||
|-
|NVI F.K.31||Netherlands||||1923||Production||||
|-
|Oeffag D.III||Austria-Hungary||||1917||Production|| ca.||
|-
|Orenco B||US||||1918||Prototype||||
|-
|Orenco D||US||||1919||Production||||
|-
|Packard-Le Peré LUSAC-11 & LUSAC-21||US||||1918||Production||||
|-
|Panavia Tornado ADV||UK||||1979||Production||||
|-
|Parnall Pipit||UK||||1928||Prototype||||
|-
|Parnall Plover||UK||||1922||Production||||
|-
|Parnall Puffin||UK||Amphibious fighter||1920||Prototype||||
|-
|Parnall Scout||UK||Zeppelin interceptor||1916||Prototype||||
|-
|Pashinin I-21||USSR||||1940||Prototype||||
|-
|Pemberton-Billing P.B.9||UK||||1914||Prototype||||
|-
|Pemberton-Billing Nighthawk||UK||Zeppelin interceptor||1917||Prototype||||
|-
|Petlyakov Pe-3||USSR||Night fighter||1941||Production||||
|-
|Petlyakov VI-100||USSR||High-altitude fighter||1939||Prototype||||
|-
|Pfalz D.III||Germany||||1917||Production||||
|-
|Pfalz D.IV||Germany||||1916||Prototype||||
|-
|Pfalz D.VI||Germany||||1917||Prototype||+||
|-
|Pfalz D.VII||Germany||||1917||Production||+||
|-
|Pfalz D.VIII||Germany||||1918||Production||||
|-
|Pfalz D.XII||Germany||||1918||Production||||
|-
|Pfalz D.XIII||Germany||||1918||Prototype||+||
|-
|Pfalz D.XIV||Germany||||1918||Prototype||+||
|-
|Pfalz D.XV||Germany||||1918||Prototype||+||
|-
|Pfalz Dr.I||Germany||||1917||Production||||
|-
|Pfalz Dr.II||Germany||||1918||Prototype||||
|-
|Pfalz E.I||France, Germany||||1915||Production||||
|-
|Pfalz E.II||France, Germany||||1915||Production||||
|-
|Pfalz E.IV||France, Germany||||1916||Production||||
|-
|Pfalz E.V||France, Germany||||1916||Production||||
|-
|Phönix 20.14||Austria-Hungary||||1917||Production||||
|-
|Phönix 20.15||Austria-Hungary||||1917||Production||||
|-
|Phönix 20.16||Austria-Hungary||Two-seat fighter||1917||Prototype||||
|-
|Phönix 20.22||Austria-Hungary||||1917||Prototype||||
|-
|Phönix 20.23||Austria-Hungary||||1917||Prototype||||
|-
|Phönix 20.24||Austria-Hungary||||1917||Prototype||||
|-
|Phönix 20.25||Austria-Hungary||||1917||Prototype||||
|-
|Phönix D.I||Austria-Hungary||||1917||Production||||
|-
|Phönix D.II||Austria-Hungary||||1917||Production||||
|-
|Phönix D.III||Austria-Hungary||||1917||Production||||
|-
|Piaggio P.2||Italy||||1923||Prototype||||
|-
|Piaggio P.119||Italy||||1942||Prototype||||
|-
|Polikarpov DI-1||USSR||Two-seat fighter||1926||Prototype||||
|-
|Polikarpov I-1||USSR||||1923||Prototype||||
|-
|Polikarpov I-3||USSR||||1928||Production||||
|-
|Polikarpov I-5||USSR||||1930||Production||||
|-
|Polikarpov I-6||USSR||||1930||Prototype||||
|-
|Polikarpov I-15||USSR||||1933||Production||||
|-
|Polikarpov I-15bis||USSR||||1937||Production||||
|-
|Polikarpov I-152||USSR||||1938||Prototype||||
|-
|Polikarpov I-153||USSR||||1938||Production||||
|-
|Polikarpov I-16||USSR||||1933||Production||||
|-
|Polikarpov I-17||USSR||||1934||Prototype||||
|-
|Polikarpov I-180||USSR||||1938||Prototype||||
|-
|Polikarpov I-185||USSR||||1941||Prototype||||
|-
|Polikarpov I-190||USSR||||1939||Prototype||||
|-
|Polikarpov ITP||USSR||||1942||Prototype||||
|-
|Polikarpov TIS||USSR||Heavy fighter||1941||Prototype||||
|-
|Pomilio FVL-8||Italy||||1919||Prototype||||
|-
|Pomilio Gamma||Italy||||1918||Prototype||||
|-
|Pomilio PD||Italy||||1917||Production||||
|-
|Ponnier M-1||France||||1915||Production||||
|-
|Port Victoria P.V.1||UK||Floatplane fighter||1916||Prototype||||
|-
|Port Victoria P.V.2 & P.V.2bis||UK||Floatplane fighter||1916||Prototype||||
|-
|Port Victoria P.V.5 & P.V.5A||UK||Floatplane fighter||1917||Prototype||||
|-
|Port Victoria P.V.7||UK||Lightweight fighter||1917||Prototype||||
|-
|Port Victoria P.V.8||UK||Lightweight fighter||1917||Prototype||||
|-
|Port Victoria P.V.9||UK||Floatplane fighter||1917||Prototype||||
|-
|Potez XI||France||||1922||Prototype||||
|-
|Potez 23||France||||1924||Prototype||||
|-
|Potez 26||France||||1924||Prototype||||
|-
|Potez 31||France||Night fighter||1929||Prototype||||
|-
|Potez 630||France||||1936||Production||||
|-
|Prajadhipok||Siam||||1929||Prototype||||
|-
|Praga E-44||Czechoslovakia||||1932||Prototype||||
|-
|Praga E-45||Czechoslovakia||||1934||Prototype||||
|-
|PWS-1 & 1bis||Poland||Two-seat fighter||1927||Prototype||||
|-
|PWS-10||Poland||||1930||Production||||
|-
|PZL P.1||Poland||||1929||Prototype||||
|-
|PZL P.6||Poland||||1930||Prototype||||
|-
|PZL P.7||Poland||||1930||Production||||
|-
|PZL P.8||Poland||||1931||Prototype||||
|-
|PZL P.11||Poland||||1931||Production||||
|-
|PZL P.24||Poland||||1933||Production|| ca.||
|-
|PZL.38 Wilk||Poland||Heavy fighter||1938||Prototype||||
|-
|PZL.50 Jastrząb||Poland||||1939||Prototype||||
|-
|Qaher-313||Iran||||2017||Project||||
|-
|Reggiane Re.2000||Italy||||1939||Production||||
|-
|Reggiane Re.2001||Italy||||1940||Production||||
|-
|Reggiane Re.2002||Italy||||1940||Production||||
|-
|Reggiane Re.2004||Italy||||1942||Prototype||||
|-
|Reggiane Re.2005||Italy||||1942||Production||||
|-
|Renard Epervier||Belgium||||1928||Prototype||||
|-
|Renard R.36, R.37 & R.38||Belgium||||1937||Prototype||||
|-
|R.E.P. C.1||France||||1918||Prototype||||
|-
|Republic P-43 Lancer||US||||1940||Production||||
|-
|Republic P-47 Thunderbolt||US||||1941||Production||||
|-
|Republic XP-72||US||||1944||Prototype||||
|-
|Republic F-84 Thunderjet||US||||1946||Production||||
|-
|Republic XF-96/F-84F Thunderstreak||US||||1950||Production||||
|-
|Republic XF-91 Thunderceptor||US||||1949||Prototype||||
|-
|Republic F-105 Thunderchief||US||||1955||Production||||
|-
|Rex D (1917)|||Germany||||1917||Prototype||||
|-
|Rikugun Ki-93||Japan||Heavy fighter||1945||Prototype||||
|-
|Rockwell XFV-12||US||||1977||Prototype||||
|-
|Rogožarski IK-3||Yugoslavia||||1938||Production||||
|-
|Romano R-110||France||Heavy fighter||1938||Prototype||||
|-
|Roussel R.30||France||||1939||Prototype||||
|-
|Royal Aircraft Factory B.E.2||UK||Night fighter||1915||Production||||
|-
|Royal Aircraft Factory B.E.12||UK||Zeppelin interceptor||1915||Production||||
|-
|Royal Aircraft Factory F.E.2||UK||||1914||Production||||
|-
|Royal Aircraft Factory F.E.8||UK||||1915||Production||||
|-
|Royal Aircraft Factory N.E.1 night fighter||UK||||1917||Prototype||||
|-
|Royal Aircraft Factory S.E.2||UK||||1913||Prototype||||
|-
|Royal Aircraft Factory S.E.4||UK||||1914||Prototype||||
|-
|Royal Aircraft Factory S.E.4a||UK||||1915||Prototype||||
|-
|Royal Aircraft Factory S.E.5 & 5a||UK||||1916||Production||||
|-
|Rumpler 6B  ||Germany||Floatplane fighter||1916||Production||||
|-
|Rumpler D.I||Germany||||1917||Prototype||+||
|-
|Ryan FR Fireball||US||Carrier mixe-propulsion fighter||1944||Production||||
|-
|Ryan XF2R Dark Shark||US||Carrier mixe-propulsion fighter||1946||Prototype||||
|-
|Saab 21||Sweden||Fighter-bomber ||1943||Production||||
|-
|Saab 21R||Sweden||Fighter-bomber jet||1947||Production||||
|-
|Saab 29 Tunnan||Sweden||||1948||Production||||
|-
|Saab 32 Lansen||Sweden||||1952||Production||||
|-
|Saab 35 Draken||Sweden||||1955||Production||||
|-
|Saab 37 Viggen||Sweden||||1967||Production||||
|-
|Saab JAS 39 Gripen||Sweden||||1988||Operational||+||
|-
|Salmson-Béchereau SB-5||France||||1925||Prototype||||
|-
|Saunders A.10||UK||||1929||Prototype||||
|-
|Saunders-Roe SR.A/1||UK||Flying-boat jet fighter||1947||Prototype||||
|-
|Saunders-Roe SR.53||UK||Interceptor with mixed propulsion||1957||Prototype||||
|-
|Savoia-Marchetti SM.88||Italy||Heavy fighter||1939||Prototype||||
|-
|Savoia-Marchetti SM.91||Italy||Fighter-bomber ||1943||Prototype||||
|-
|Savoia-Marchetti SM.92||Italy||Fighter-bomber||1943||Prototype||||
|-
|Schütte-Lanz D.I||Germany||||1915||Prototype||||
|-
|Schütte-Lanz D.II||Germany||||1915||Prototype||||
|-
|Schütte-Lanz D.III||Germany||||1918||Prototype||||
|-
|Schütte-Lanz D.IV||Germany||||1918||Prototype||||
|-
|SEA IV||France||||1918||Production||||
|-
|SET XV||Romania||||1934||Prototype||||
|-
|Seversky AP-9||US||||1939||Prototype||||
|-
|Seversky P-35||US||||1935||Production||||
|-
|Seversky XP-41||US||||1939||Prototype||||
|-
|Shchetinin (Grigorovich) M-11 & M-12||Russia||Flying-boat fighter||1916||Production||||
|-
|Shenyang J-5||China||||1956||Production||||
|-
|Shenyang J-6||China||||1958||Production||||
|-
|Shenyang J-8 & J-8II||China||||1969||Operational||||
|-
|Shenyang J-11||China||||1998||Operational||||
|-
|Shenyang J-15||China||||2009||Operational||||
|-
|Shenyang J-16||China||||2011||Operational||+||
|-
|Shenyang FC-31||China||||2012||Prototype||+||
|-
|Short Gurnard||UK||Shipboard fighter||1929||Prototype||||
|-
|SIAI S.52||Italy||||1924||Production||||
|-
|SIAI S.58||Italy||Flying-boat fighter||1924||Production||||
|-
|SIAI S.67||Italy||Flying-boat fighter||1930||Production||||
|-
|Siemens-Schuckert D.I||Germany||||1916||Production||||
|-
|Siemens-Schuckert D.II||Germany||||1917||Prototype||||
|-
|Siemens-Schuckert D.III||Germany||||1917||Production||||
|-
|Siemens-Schuckert D.IV||Germany||||1918||Production||||
|-
|Siemens-Schuckert D.V||Germany||||1918||Prototype||||
|-
|Siemens-Schuckert D.VI||Germany||||1918||Prototype||||
|-
|Siemens-Schuckert DDr.I||Germany||Twin-engine fighter||1917||Prototype||||
|-
|Siemens-Schuckert E.I, E.II & E.III||Germany||||1915||Production||||
|-
|Sikorsky S-16||Russia||||1915||Production|| ca.||
|-
|Sikorsky S-18||Russia||Escort fighter||1917||Prototype||||
|-
|Sikorsky S-20||Russia||||1916||Production||||
|-
|SNCAC (Centre) NC.1080||France||Carrier fighter||1949||Prototype||||
|-
|SNCAN (Nord) N.2200||France||Carrier fighter||1949||Prototype||||
|-
|SNCAO (Ouest) CAO.200||France||||1939||Prototype||||
|-
|SNCASO (Sud Aviation) Vautour II||France||Interceptor||1952||Production||||
|-
|SNCASE Baroudeur ||France||Lightweight fighter||1953||Prototype||||
|-
|SNCASE (Sud-Est) Aquilon||UK, France||Carrier fighter||1951||Production||||
|-
|SNCASE (Sud-Est) SE.100||France||Heavy fighter||1939||Prototype||||
|-
|SNCASE (Sud-Est) Durandal||France||Interceptor||1956||Prototype||||
|-
|SNCASO (Sud-Ouest) Espadon||France||Interceptor||1948||Prototype||||
|-
|SNCASO (Sud-Ouest) Trident||France||Interceptor||1953||Prototype||||
|-
|Sopwith Baby||UK||Floatplane fighter||1915||Production||||
|-
|Sopwith Bulldog||UK||Two-seat fighter||1918||Prototype||||
|-
|Sopwith Buffalo||UK||Fighter-reconnaissance||1918||Prototype||||
|-
|Sopwith Camel||UK||||1916||Production||||
|-
|Sopwith Dolphin||UK||||1917||Production||||
|-
|Sopwith Dragon||UK||||1918||Prototype|| ca.||
|-
|Sopwith Gunbus||UK||||1914||Production||||
|-
|Sopwith 3F.2 Hippo||UK||Two-seat fighter||1917||Prototype||||
|-
|Sopwith Hispano-Suiza Triplane||UK||||1916||Prototype||||
|-
|Sopwith 1½ Strutter||UK||Two-seat fighter||1915||Production||||
|-
|Sopwith L.R.T.Tr.||UK||Escort fighter||1916||Prototype||||
|-
|Sopwith Pup||UK||||1916||Production||||
|-
|Sopwith Schneider||UK||||1914||Production|| ca.||
|-
|Sopwith Snail||UK||||1918||Prototype||||
|-
|Sopwith Snapper||UK||||1919||Prototype||||
|-
|Sopwith Snark||UK||||1919||Prototype||||
|-
|Sopwith Snipe||UK||||1917||Production||||
|-
|Sopwith Swallow||UK||||1918||Prototype||||
|-
|Sopwith Triplane||UK||||1916||Production||||
|-
|SPAD S.A-1, 2, 3, 4 & SG||France||Two-seat fighter||1915||Production||||
|-
|SPAD S.VII||France||||1916||Production||+||
|-
|SPAD S.XI Cn2 ||France||Night fighter||1917||Prototype||||
|-
|SPAD S.XII||France||Cannon fighter||1917||Production||||
|-
|SPAD S.XIII||France||||1917||Production||||
|-
|SPAD S.XIV||France||Floatplane fighter||1917||Production||||
|-
|SPAD S.XV||France||||1917||Prototype||||
|-
|SPAD S.XVII||France||||1918||Production||||
|-
|SPAD S.XX||France||||1918||Production||||
|-
|SPAD S.XXI||France||||1918||Prototype||||
|-
|SPAD S.XXII||France||||1919||Prototype||||
|-
|SPAD S.XXIV||France||Shipboard fighter||1918||Prototype||||
|-
|Spijker/Spijker-Trompenburg V.3||Netherlands||||1918||Prototype||||
|-
|Standard E-1||US||||1917||Production||||
|-
|Sturtevant B||US||Speed scout/pursuit||1916||Prototype||||
|-
|Sukhoi Su-1 & Su-3||USSR||High-altitude fighter||1940||Prototype||||
|-
|Sukhoi Su-5||USSR||Mixed power||1945||Prototype||||
|-
|Sukhoi Su-7 (1944)||USSR||||1944||Prototype||||
|-
|Sukhoi Su-9 (1946)||USSR||||1946||Prototype||||
|-
|Sukhoi Su-11 (1947)||USSR||||1947||Prototype||||
|-
|Sukhoi Su-15 (1949)||USSR||Interceptor||1949||Prototype||||
|-
|Sukhoi Su-7||USSR||fighter-bomber||1955||Production||||
|-
|Sukhoi Su-9||USSR||Interceptor||1957||Production||||
|-
|Sukhoi Su-11||USSR||Interceptor||1958||Production||||
|-
|Sukhoi Su-15||USSR||Interceptor||1962||Production||||
|-
|Sukhoi Su-17, 20 & 22||USSR||Fighter-bomber||1966||Operational||||
|-
|Sukhoi Su-27||USSR||||1977||Operational||||
|-
|Sukhoi Su-30||Russia||||1989||Operational||+||
|-
|Sukhoi Su-32/Su-34||Russia||||1990||Operational||||
|-
|Sukhoi Su-33||Russia||||1987||Operational||||
|-
|Sukhoi Su-27M/Su-35||Russia||||1988||Operational||||
|-
|Sukhoi Su-37||Russia||||1996||Prototype||||
|-
|Sukhoi Su-47||Russia||||1997||Prototype||||
|-
|Sukhoi Su-57/HAL FGFA||Russia, India||||2010||Operational||||
|-
|Sukhoi Su-30MKI||India, Russia||||2000||Operational||||
|-
|Sukhoi T-3||USSR||Interceptor||1956||Prototype||||
|-
|Sukhoi P-1||USSR||Interceptor||1957||Prototype||||
|-
|Supermarine 224 F.7/30||UK||||1934||Prototype||||
|-
|Supermarine 508||UK||||1951||Prototype||||
|-
|Supermarine 510||UK||||1948||Prototype||||
|-
|Supermarine 525||UK||||1954||Prototype||||
|-
|Supermarine 528||UK||||1950||Prototype||||
|-
|Supermarine 529||UK||||1952||Prototype||||
|-
|Supermarine 535||UK||||1950||Prototype||||
|-
|Supermarine Attacker||UK||Carrier jet fighter||1946||Production||||
|-
|Supermarine Scimitar||UK||Carrier strike fighter||1956||Production||||
|-
|Supermarine Seafang||UK||Carrier fighter||1946||Prototype||||
|-
|Supermarine Seafire||UK||Carrier fighter||1941||Production||||
|-
|Supermarine Sea King||UK||Flying-boat fighter||1920||Prototype||||
|-
|Supermarine Spitfire||UK||||1936||Production||||
|-
|Supermarine Spiteful||UK||||1944||Prototype||||
|-
|Supermarine Swift||UK||||1948||Production||||
|-
|Svenska Aero Jaktfalken I & II||Sweden||||1929||Production||||
|-
|Tachikawa Ki-106||Japan||||1945||Prototype||||
|-
|TAI Hürjet||Turkey||Light combat||2017||Project||||
|-
|TAI TF-X||Turkey||||2019||Prototype||||
|-
|Tairov Ta-1||USSR||Escort fighter||1939||Prototype||||
|-
|Tairov Ta-3||USSR||Escort fighter||1939||Prototype||||
|-
|Tebaldi-Zari||Italy||||1919||Prototype||||
|-
|Tereshchenko No 7||Russia||||1916||Prototype||||
|-
|Thomas-Morse MB-1||US||||1918||Prototype||||
|-
|Thomas-Morse MB-2||US||||1918||Prototype||||
|-
|Thomas-Morse MB-3||US||||1919||Production||||
|-
|Thomas-Morse MB-9||US||||1922||Prototype||||
|-
|Thomas-Morse XP-13||US||||1929||Prototype||||
|-
|Thomas Morse TM-23||US||||1924||Prototype||||
|-
|Thulin K||Sweden||||1917||Production||||
|-
|TNCA Series C Microplano||Mexico||||1918||Prototype||||
|-
|TNCA Series E Tololoche||Mexico||||1924||Production||||
|-
|Tokorozawa Koshiki-2||Japan||||1922||Prototype||||
|-
|Tomasevic I-110||USSR||Heavy fighter||1942||Prototype||||
|-
|Tupolev ANT-5/I-4||USSR||||1927||Production||||
|-
|Tupolev ANT-13/I-8||USSR||||1930||Prototype||||
|-
|Tupolev ANT-21||USSR||||1933||Prototype||||
|-
|Tupolev ANT-23/I-12||USSR||||1931||Prototype||||
|-
|Tupolev ANT-29||USSR||Cannon fighter||1935||Prototype||||
|-
|Tupolev ANT-31/I-14||USSR||||1933||Production||||
|-
|Tupolev ANT-46/DI-8||USSR||Heavy cannon fighter||1935||Prototype||||
|-
|Tupolev Tu-1||USSR||Night fighter||1947||Prototype||||
|-
|Tupolev Tu-28/Tu-128||USSR||Interceptor||1961||Production||||
|-
|VEF I-16||Latvia||||1940||Prototype||||
|-
|VFW VAK 191B||West Germany||VTOL fighter||1971||Prototype||||
|-
|VL Humu||Finland||||1944||Prototype||||
|-
|VL Mörkö-Morane||Finland||||1943||Production||||
|-
|VL Myrsky||Finland||||1941||Production||||
|-
|VL Pyörremyrsky||Finland||||1945||Prototype||||
|-
|Vickers E.F.B.1||UK||||1913||Prototype||||
|-
|Vickers E.F.B.2||UK||||1913||Prototype||||
|-
|Vickers E.F.B.3||UK||||1913||Prototype||||
|-
|Vickers F.B.5||UK||||1914||Production||||
|-
|Vickers E.F.B.7||UK||Twin-engine fighter||1915||Prototype||||
|-
|Vickers E.F.B.8||UK||Twin-engine fighter||1915||Prototype||||
|-
|Vickers F.B.9||UK||||1915||Production||||
|-
|Vickers F.B.11||UK||Escort fighter||1916||Prototype||||
|-
|Vickers F.B.12||UK||||1916||Production||||
|-
|Vickers F.B.16||UK||||1916||Prototype||||
|-
|Vickers F.B.19||UK||||1916||Production||||
|-
|Vickers F.B.24||UK||Two-seat fighter||1917||Prototype||||
|-
|Vickers F.B.25||UK||Night fighter||1917||Prototype||||
|-
|Vickers E.S.1||UK||||1915||Prototype||||
|-
|Vickers Jockey||UK||||1930||Prototype||||
|-
|Vickers Type 123 & 141||UK||||1926||Prototype||||
|-
|Vickers Type 143 Bolivian Scout||UK||||1929||Production||||
|-
|Vickers Type 161||UK||Interceptor||1931||Prototype||||
|-
|Vickers Type 177||UK||Carrier fighter||1929||Prototype||||
|-
|Vickers Type 432||UK||High altitude interceptor||1942||Prototype||||
|-
|Vickers Vampire||UK||||1917||Prototype||||
|-
|Vickers Venom||UK||||1936||Prototype||||
|-
|Vickers Vireo||UK||||1928||Prototype||||
|-
|Villiers II||France||Carrier fighter||1925||Production||||
|-
|Villiers V||France||Night fighter||1926||Prototype||||
|-
|Villiers VIII||France||Carrier fighter||1926||Prototype||||
|-
|Villiers XXIV||France||Night fighter||1926||Prototype||||
|-
|Vought VE-7S & VE-7SF||US||Shipboard fighter||1917||Production||||
|-
|Vought VE-8||US||||1918||Prototype||||
|-
|Vought VE-9||US||||1922||Production||||
|-
|Vought V-80||US||||1933||Production||||
|-
|Vought V-141/V-143||US||||1936||Prototype||||
|-
|Vought FU||US||||1926||Production||||
|-
|Vought XF2U||US||Two-seat fighter||1929||Prototype||||
|-
|Vought XF3U||US||Two-seat fighter||1933||Prototype||||
|-
|Vought F4U/FG/F3A Corsair||US||fighter-bomber||1940||Production||||
|-
|Vought XF5U||US||||1947||Prototype||||
|-
|Vought F6U Pirate||US||Carrier fighter||1946||Prototype||||
|-
|Vought F7U Cutlass||US||Carrier fighter||1948||Production||||
|-
|Vought F8U/F-8 Crusader||US||Carrier fighter||1955||Production||||
|-
|Vought XF8U-3 Crusader III||US||||1958||Prototype||||
|-
|Vultee XP-54||US||||1943||Prototype||||
|-
|Vultee P-66 Vanguard||US||||1939||Production||||
|-
|Waco CSO-A/240A||US||||1927||Production||||
|-
|Waco CTO-A||US||||1927||Prototype||||
|-
|Weiss Manfréd WM-23 Ezüst Nyíl||Hungary||||1941||Prototype||||
|-
|Westland C.O.W. Gun Fighter||UK||Cannon fighter||1930||Prototype||||
|-
|Westland F.7/30||UK||Day & night fighter||1934||Prototype||||
|-
|Westland Interceptor||UK||Interceptor||1929||Prototype||||
|-
|Westland N.1B||UK||Floatplane fighter||1917||Prototype||||
|-
|Westland Wagtail||UK||||1918||Prototype||||
|-
|Westland Weasel||UK||Fighter-reconnaissance||1918||Prototype||||
|-
|Westland Welkin||UK||High-altitude interceptor||1942||Production||||
|-
|Westland Westbury||UK||Heavy fighter||1926||Prototype||||
|-
|Westland Whirlwind||UK||Heavy fighter||1938||Production||||
|-
|Westland Wizard||UK||||1927||Prototype||||
|-
|Westland Wyvern||UK||Torpedo/strike fighter||1946||Production||||
|-
|Weymann W-1||France||||1915||Prototype||||
|-
|Wibault 1||France||||1918||Prototype||||
|-
|Wibault 3||France||||1923||Prototype||||
|-
|Wibault 7 & Vickers Wibault||France||||1924||Production||||
|-
|Wibault 8 Simoun||France||||1926||Prototype||||
|-
|Wibault 9||France||||1926||Prototype||||
|-
|Wibault 12, 121 & 122 Sirocco||France||||1926||Prototype||||
|-
|Wibault 130 Trombe & 170 Tornade||France||Lightweight fighter||1928||Prototype||||
|-
|Wibault 210||France||||1929||Prototype||||
|-
|Wibault 313||France||||1932||Prototype||||
|-
|Wight Baby||UK||Floatplane fighter||1916||Prototype||||
|-
|Wight Quadruplane||UK||||1916||Prototype||||
|-
|WKF D.I||Austria-Hungary||||1918||Prototype||||
|-
|WKF Dr.I||Austria-Hungary||||1918||Prototype||||
|-
|Wright XF3W||US||||1926||Prototype||||
|-
|Xian JH-7||China||||1988||Operational||||
|-
|Yakovlev I-29||USSR||||1939||Prototype||||
|-
|Yakovlev Yak-1||USSR||||1940||Production||||
|-
|Yakovlev I-30/Yak-3||USSR||||1941||Production||||
|-
|Yakovlev Yak-7||USSR||||1940||Production||||
|-
|Yakovlev Yak-9||USSR||||1942||Production||||
|-
|Yakovlev Yak-15||USSR||||1946||Production||||
|-
|Yakovlev Yak-17||USSR||||1947||Production||||
|-
|Yakovlev Yak-19||USSR||||1947||Prototype||||
|-
|Yakovlev Yak-23||USSR||||1947||Production||||
|-
|Yakovlev Yak-25 (1947)||USSR||||1947||Prototype||||
|-
|Yakovlev Yak-25||USSR||Interceptor||1952||Production||||
|-
|Yakovlev Yak-27V/K||USSR||Interceptor||1956||Prototype||+||
|-
|Yakovlev Yak-28P||USSR||Interceptor||1960||Production||||
|-
|Yakovlev Yak-30 (1948)||USSR||||1948||Prototype||||
|-
|Yakovlev Yak-36||USSR||VTOL fighter||1963||Prototype||||
|-
|Yakovlev Yak-38||USSR||Carrier VTOL fighter||1971||Production||||
|-
|Yakovlev Yak-41/141||USSR||||1987||Prototype||||
|-
|Yakovlev Yak-50 (1949)||USSR||||1949||Prototype||||
|-
|Yatsenko I-28||USSR||||1939||Prototype||||
|-
|Yokosuka D4Y2-S||Japan||Night fighter||1940||Production||+||
|-
|Yokosuka P1Y2 Kyokko||Japan||Night fighter||1943||Production||||
|-
|Zeppelin-Lindau (Dornier) D.I||Germany||||1918||Prototype||||
|}

See also
List of bomber aircraft
List of attack aircraft

Notes

References

Bibliography

Lists of aircraft by role
Lists of military aircraft